Trampling is the act of walking on something repeatedly by humans or animals.

Trampling on open ground can destroy the above ground parts of many plants and can compact the soil, thereby creating a distinct microenvironment that specific species may be adapted for.

It can be used as part of a wildlife management strategy along grazing.

When carrying out investigations like a belt transect, trampling should be avoided. At other times, it is part of the experimental design.

Trampling can be a  disturbance to ecology and to archaeological sites.

References 

Human impact on the environment
Ecology